Guy Johnson may refer to:

 Guy Johnson (c. 1740–1788), military officer and diplomat for the Crown during the American Revolutionary War
 Guy Johnson (baseball player) (1891–1971), who built the Mystic Theatre (Marmarth, North Dakota)
 Guy Benton Johnson (1901–1991), American sociologist and social anthropologist
 Guy Johnson (businessman), English businessman
 Guy Johnson (journalist), journalist at Bloomberg L.P.
 Detective Guy Johnson, a movie character played by James Stewart in It's a Wonderful World
 Guy Johnson (born Clyde), son of author Maya Angelou

See also 
 Guy Johnston (born 1981), British cellist